Nesser is an unincorporated community in East Baton Rouge Parish, Louisiana, United States.

Etymology
The community is named after Ludwig Nesser. A German from Trier, Germany that immigrated to Baton Rouge to work on a plantation owned by the Garig family. After getting married he purchased five acres of land and a built a small house. Then in 1883 the United States Federal Government established a post office in the region. They appointed Nesser as the first postmaster. He served as the postmaster until 1897.

Siegen Lane
When the Louisiana Railway and Navigation Company built a line through the area they renamed the road Siegen Lane.

References

Unincorporated communities in East Baton Rouge Parish, Louisiana
Unincorporated communities in Louisiana